Roger Stephen R. J. Sylvester (17 August 1968 – 19 January 1999) was a mentally ill man who died after being detained outside his home in Tottenham, London, by eight Metropolitan Police officers. It was reported that his neighbours had complained to police of a disturbance after Sylvester had started banging on his own front door, naked.

Police detained Sylvester under the Mental Health Act, then took him to St Ann's Hospital, Haringey, where he fell into a coma while being restrained on the floor of a padded room by six officers while being assessed by medical staff. He died at Whittington Hospital, Islington, 8 days later without regaining consciousness.

In 2003, an inquest heard that Sylvester, who suffered from bipolar disorder, had died of serious brain damage and cardiac arrest, caused by difficulty breathing because of the position he was held in. A jury returned a verdict of unlawful killing in October 2003.

The eight officers who had taken Sylvester into custody appealed to the High Court against what they called an "irrational" ruling, and the verdict was overturned in November 2004.

In 1999, forensic pathologist Freddy Patel was reprimanded by the General Medical Council (GMC) for releasing medical details about Roger Sylvester to reporters outside an inquest hearing, Patel told reporters that Sylvester was a crack cocaine user, something his family denied. Patel later performed the controversial police postmortem following the death of Ian Tomlinson in April 2009. that favoured the disproven police account. In 2012 he was struck off by the General Medical Council who found that he was not only incompetent but also dishonest.

See also
UK deaths in custody
Death of Christopher Alder
Death of Colin Roach
Death of Olaseni Lewis
Death of Oluwashijibomi Lapite
Death of Sean Rigg
Death of Wayne Douglas

Notes

External links
Waldran, Justin. Roger Sylvester, National Civil Rights Movement
Independent Advisory Panel on Deaths in Custody. 

1968 births
1999 deaths
Deaths by person in London
Deaths in police custody in the United Kingdom
People with bipolar disorder
Black British people